= Prodotoides =

Scientific classification
- Missing taxonomy template (fix): Prodotoides

Genus of weevils

Prodotoides is a genus of weevils, however no species are currently assigned to this genus.
